Loch Broom or Lochbroom may refer to:

Loch Broom, Nova Scotia
Loch Broom, a sea loch located in Ross and Cromarty, Scotland
Lochbroom, Highland, a civil parish in Scotland
Lochbroom Camanachd, a Scottish shinty club
, a British coaster